Kerry Haywood (6 May 1950 – 9 August 2010) was  a former Australian rules footballer who played with North Melbourne in the Victorian Football League (VFL). 

Haywood played 31 games with Camberwell Football Club in 1979 and 1980. Haywood was a member of Camberwell's 1979 premiership team.

References

External links 		
		
		
		
		
		
		
		
1950 births		
2010 deaths		
Australian rules footballers from Victoria (Australia)		
North Melbourne Football Club players
Camberwell Football Club players